Froemming Brothers of Milwaukee, Wisconsin was a shipyard that built ships for World War II under the emergency shipbuilding program, War Shipping Administration and United States Navy. Froemming Brothers shipyard was opened in 1942 by Ben Froemming (1902-1945). Froemming Brothers closed after the war in 1945, after building 26 ships. The shipyard was located on the north side of the Kinnickinnic River. The shipyard had 2,400 workers in three shifts. In 1945 it was sold to Wagner Iron Works and later sold to the Milwaukee Marine Yacht. The site today is Horny Goat Marina, Blue Max Charters and Clete Long Enterprises.

Legacy
Ben Froemming died in 1945 near the end of the war. The last ship built at the yard had its name changed before the christening. The SS Tapir Splice a C1-M-AV1 Cargo ship was renamed the SS Ben Froemming and delivered to the War Shipping Administration in October 1945. After the war in 1947, the Ben Froemming was sold to a private company. In 1975 she was converted to the drillship SS Goldrill.

Ships built
Froemming Brothers for World War II:
V4-M-A1  Type V ship Tugboats, at a cost of $1.2 million each.
S2-S2-AQ1, Tacoma-class frigate, 
 C1-M-AV1 Type C1 ships Cargo ships

Tacoma-class frigate 4 built:
USS Allentown
USS Sandusky (PF-54)
USS Bath (PF-55)
USS Machias (PF-53)

Type V ship - tug boat, V4-M-A1 8 built
Point Loma Scrapped 1972
Anacapa Scrapped 1973
Point Vicente To Mexico 1969 renamed Huitilopochtli (A 51)
Point Arguello Scrapped 1973
Sankaty Head Helped with Normandy landings, Scrapped 1978
Yaqina Head Sold private 1971, scrapped
Bald Island Scrapped 1973
Fire Island Scrapped 1972

C1 Ships, C1-M-AV1 Cargo ships, 14 built:
USS Chatham (AK-169)
USS Craighead (AK-175)
USS Claiborne (AK-171)
USS Chicot (AK-170)
USS Colquitt (AK-174)
USS Clarion (AK-172)
USS Charlevoix (AK-168)
Doddridge, renamed Coastal Messenger, then USCGC Courier
Codington
Duval, renamed Coastal Racer, then YFP-10
Knob Knot
Salmon Knot
Yard Hitch
Tapir Splice, renamed  Ben Froemming, then Golddrill 5

See also
Walter Butler Shipbuilders

References

Defunct shipbuilding companies of the United States